Rowena is an unincorporated community in Redwood County, in the U.S. state of Minnesota.

History
Rowena was laid out in 1902. The community was named after the character Lady Rowena from Walter Scott's novel Ivanhoe.

References

Unincorporated communities in Redwood County, Minnesota
Unincorporated communities in Minnesota